Vonk is a Dutch metonymic occupational surname. Vonk means "spark" and refers to the work of a Smith. People with this surname include:

Alice Vonk (1908–1997), American floriculturist
Britt Vonk (born 1991), Dutch softball player
 (1901–1988), Dutch revue and cabaret performer
Erik Vonk (born 1953), Dutch banker and entrepreneur
Freek Vonk (born 1983), Dutch biologist
Hans Vonk (conductor) (1942–2004), Dutch conductor, champion of Dutch composers
Hans Vonk (cyclist) (born 1959), Dutch racing cyclist
Hans Vonk (footballer) (born 1970), South African football goalkeeper
Henk Vonk (1942–2019), Dutch football trainer and scout
Marcel Vonk (born 1974), Dutch poker player and physicist
Matt Vonk (born 1990), Canadian football offensive lineman
Michel Vonk (born 1968), Dutch football player and manager
Rob Vonk (born 1950), Dutch modern pentathlete
Roos Vonk (born 1960), Dutch psychologist
Theo Vonk (born 1947), Dutch footballer
Levi Vonk (born 1990), American Writer

See also 
Vonck
Vonk (disambiguation)

References

Dutch-language surnames
Occupational surnames